The Class 630 was a class of steam tank locomotives with 2-6-2 wheel arrangement operated by the Chōsen Railway in colonial Korea. The first five were built for the company by Kisha Seizō of Japan for use on the railway's Hwanghae Line; they were numbered 630 through 634 (works numbers 1113-1117); these were joined by an unknown number built by Nippon Sharyō in the same year.

After the Liberation and partition of Korea, these locomotives were taken over by the Korean State Railway of North Korea, and were likely scrapped after the conversion of the Hwanghae Line network to standard gauge in 1973. Their KSR numbering is unknown.

Class 655
The Class 655 was a class of three 2-6-2T tank locomotives built by Kisha Seizō for the Chōsen Railway in 1935 (works numbers 1302-1304). Numbered 655 through 657, they were  nearly identical to the Class 630 engines.

Like the Class 630, these were taken over by the Korean State Railway in 1948, but their subsequent fate is unknown.

References

Locomotives of Korea
Locomotives of North Korea
Railway locomotives introduced in 1930
2-6-2 locomotives
Kisha Seizo locomotives
Nippon Sharyo locomotives
Narrow gauge steam locomotives of Korea
Chosen Railway